Akka Thangi is a 2008 Indian Kannada language film written and directed by S. Mahendar. It stars Shruti and Rashmi in the lead roles. The supporting cast features Mohan, Kishore and Sharan.

Cast
 Shruti as Nagi
 Rashmi as Kaveri, Nagi's sister
 Mohan
 Kishore as Huliyappa
 Sharan
 Vaijanath Biradar
 Shankar Rao
 Siddaraj Kalyankar
 Dr. Manu
 Namratha
 M. N. Lakshmi Devi
 Kishori Ballal
 Padmaja Rao
 Baby Sahana
 Baby Padmavathi
 Baby Shravanishree
 Master Bharath Venkatadri
 Master Rakesh

Soundtrack

V. Manohar composed the film's background score and music for its soundtrack. The album consists of five tracks.

Critical reception
Upon theatrical release, the film received positive reviews from critics. R. G. Vijayasarathy of Rediff rated the film 3.5/5 and called it "an emotionally engaging film made on a reasonable budget with a strong story, good narration and pleasing music." On the acting performances he wrote, "... Shruti makes a deep impression as the elder sister. Kishore in the role of Huliyappa who stands out with another strong performance." He added, "V Manohar's music is the other plus point of the film." Newstrack India too rated the film 3.5/5 and the reviewer felt that the film "comes as a breath of fresh air" adding that it "has a strong native fervour and its highlight is its realistic narration. Besides, it gives a message promoting a value-based life where truth prevails." The reviewer further wrote, "The film stands out for excellent acting by Shruti, Mohan and Kishore that is matched by great dialogues written by Madhu and Mohan. Mahendar's direction and Manohar's music are exceptional." Sify.com called it an "above average" film and the reviewer wrote, "The beauty of this film is the narration in a convincing manner which will appeal to all. The film belongs to Shruti as it showcases the potentiality of this talented actress."

References

2008 films
Films directed by S. Mahendar
2000s Kannada-language films